Ying Pun Ha Chuk Hang is a village in Tai Po District, Hong Kong.

It comprises two distinct settlements: Ying Pun Ha and Chuk Hang.

History
At the time of the 1911 census, the population of Chuk Hang San Wai was 18. The number of males was 7.

See also
 San Wai Tsai (Tai Po District), a nearby village

References

External links

 Delineation of area of existing village Ying Pun Ha Chuk Hang (Tai Po) for election of resident representative (2019 to 2022)
 

Villages in Tai Po District, Hong Kong